Orchelimum agile, the agile meadow katydid, is a species of meadow katydid in the family Tettigoniidae. It is found in North America.

References

agile
Articles created by Qbugbot
Insects described in 1773
Taxa named by Charles De Geer